Jacques d'Armagnac (4 August 1477), duke of Nemours, was the son of Bernard d'Armagnac, count of Pardiac, and Eleanor of Bourbon-La Marche.

As the Count of Castres, Jacques served under Charles VII of France in Normandy in 1449 and 1450, and afterwards in Guienne. Louis XI awarded him with honours. In 1462, Jacques succeeded his father, and Louis XI married him to his god-daughter, Louise of Anjou, daughter of Charles of Le Maine. Louis XI also recognized his title to the duchy of Nemours, which he had disputed with the King of Navarre.

Sent by Louis to pacify Roussillon, Nemours felt that he had been insufficiently rewarded for the rapid success of this expedition, and joined the League of the Public Weal in 1465. Subsequently, he reconciled with Louis, but soon resumed his intrigues. After twice pardoning him, the king's patience became exhausted, and he besieged the duke's chateau at Carlat and imprisoned him. Nemours was treated with the utmost rigour, being shut up in a cage. He was finally condemned to death and beheaded, 4 Aug 1477.

Jacques and Louise had:
 Jacques (d. young)
 Jean d'Armagnac, Duke of Nemours (1467–1500)
 Louis d'Armagnac, Duke of Nemours (1500–1503)
 Marguerite d'Armagnac, Duchess of Nemours (d. 1503), married Peter de Rohan (d.1514)
 Catherine d'Armagnac (d. 1487), married John II, Duke of Bourbon in 1484
 Charlotte d'Armagnac, Duchess of Nemours (d. 1504), married Charles de Rohan (d.1504)

References

Sources

|-

1430s births
1477 deaths

Year of birth uncertain

Armagnac, Jacques of

Counts of Castres
Armagnac, Jacques of
Armagnac, Jacques of
People executed by France by decapitation
Executed French people
People executed by the Ancien Régime in France
15th-century peers of France
Prisoners of the Bastille
15th-century executions by France